The Hunter is a 2010 Iranian drama film directed by and starring Rafi Pitts. It was nominated for the Golden Bear at the 60th Berlin International Film Festival.

Plot
Working-class Ali takes a job as a factory watchman to support his wife Sara and daughter Saba, but his night shift gives him little time to see them. During his off hours he enjoys hunting in the woods. One day he returns from work to find Sara and Saba are gone from his apartment. Soon after he is called to the police station where he learns his wife has been shot during a protest and his daughter is missing. Some days later, he is asked to identify the body of a young girl. Ali visits his mother, but doesn't tell her about the deaths of his wife and daughter.

Ali parks his car by a motorway and shoots at a passing police car, killing both officers inside. He then escapes into the back country. After a chase, he flees into the woods, but is captured by two police officers who subsequently become lost. The officers argue about what to do with the prisoner. One seems more sympathetic to Ali, and tells him that the other is trying to shift the blame for killing a civilian.

Camping in an abandoned house for the night, the more sympathetic officer unlocks Ali's handcuffs and gives him a gun, suggesting he kill the other officer before leaving. Ali holds the officer at gunpoint, but takes his clothes and leaves him handcuffed instead of killing him. Leaving the house in the officer's uniform, he is shot by the officer who had given him the gun.

Cast
 Rafi Pitts as Ali Alavi
 Mitra Hajjar as Sara Alavi
 Ali Nicksaulat as Officer Nazem
 Hassan Ghalenoi as Police Soldier
 Amir Ayoubi as Police Officer
 Naser Madahi as Night guard 1
 Ali Mazinani as Young night guard
 Hossein Nickbakht as Hotel 
 Gholamreza Rajabzadeh as Police Officer
 Mansour Dowlatmand as Police Officer
 Manoochehr Rahimi as Inspector
 Saba Yaghoobi as Saba Alavi
 Sara Kamrani as Orphonage Nurse
 Malek Jahan Khazai as Mother
 Ismaïl Amani as Sanam
 Ossta Shah Tir as Father

Reception
On review aggregator Rotten Tomatoes, the film holds an approval rating of 76% based on 25 reviews, with a weighted average rating of 6.2/10. On Metacritic, the film has a weighted average score of 76 out of 100, based on 11 critics, indicating "generally favorable reviews".

References

External links

2010 films
2010s Persian-language films
2010 drama films
Films directed by Rafi Pitts
Films set in Iran
German drama films
Iranian drama films
2010s German films